Herbal Essences is a brand of hair care products line by Procter & Gamble. The brand was founded in 1971 as the single shampoo  Clairol Herbal Essence Shampoo (officially typeset as Clairol herbal essence shampoo). There are 29 collections of varying hair care products, each designed to have a different effect on the user's hair.

History
Clairol introduced Herbal Essence in 1971. The original Herbal Essence (now called Herbal Essences) used a cartoon image of the nature girl in a pool on the front label. The original color of the shampoo was green, and could be seen through the clear plastic bottle packaging.

In 1990, sex therapist and radio and tv host Ruth Westheimer (Dr. Ruth) appeared in a tv commercial for the shampoo and body wash.

Currently, their shampoos and conditioners are characterized to be paraben, gluten, and sulfate-free. 

The company is developing sustainable strategies to cooperate with the environment. They partnered up with World Wildlife Fund Canada to work together to plant native plants that will attract pollinators, renew wildlife habitats in Canada, and build healthy, biodiverse landscapes that are more resilient to climate change. Additionally, in 2016, as a part of the Herbal Essences Sustainability Program, they begun purchasing certified renewable electricity credits—which come from windmills—for their Iowa City plant.

Sale 
Herbal Essences was sold to Procter & Gamble in 2001 from Clairol. The company was in a "long-term decline" according to Chairman and CEO A.G. Lafley.

References

External links
 Herbal Essences Official website

Shampoo brands
Procter & Gamble brands
Products introduced in 1971
2001 mergers and acquisitions